Mòcheno is an Upper German variety spoken in three towns of the Bersntol, in Trentino, northeastern Italy.

Mòcheno is closely related to Bavarian and is variously classified either as a Southern Bavarian variety or a separate language of its own. It has also been posited that it may be descended from Lombardic. Mòcheno speakers reportedly partially understand Bavarian, Cimbrian, or Standard German. However, many essential differences in grammar, vocabulary, and pronunciation render it difficult for speakers of Standard German to understand.

Name 
The name Mòcheni used by bilingual Italian- and Ladin-speaking neighbours to refer to the speakers of the language has been coined from the verb mòchen "to make", often used to build compound predicates in the language.

Geographic distribution 
According to the census of 2001, the first in which data on native languages were recorded, Mòcheno was spoken by a majority in the following municipalities (numbers of members of the Mòcheno linguistic group): Fierozzo/Florutz/Vlarotz (423 people, 95.92%), Palù/Palai/Palae (184 people, 95.34%), Frassilongo/Gereut/Garait (340 people, 95.24%, including the village of Roveda/Eichleit/Oachlait). In other municipalities of Trentino 1,329 persons declared themselves members of the Mòcheno linguistic group, a total of 2,276 in Trentino. In the 2011 census, the total number of speakers in the Province decreased to 1,660.

Status 
Mòcheno is officially recognised in Trentino by provincial and national law. Starting in the 1990s, various laws and regulations have been passed by the Italian parliament and provincial assembly that put the Mòcheno language and culture under protection. A cultural institute was founded by decree, whose purpose is to safeguard and raise  awareness of the language. School curricula were adapted in order to teach in Mòcheno, and Italian street signs are being changed to bilingual Mòcheno/Italian.

Sample text

References

Further reading 
Grammar
Anthony Rowley: Liacht as de sproch. Grammatica della lingua mòchena / Grammatik des Deutsch-Fersentalerischen. Istituto Culturale Mòcheno-Cimbro / Kulturinstitut für das Fersental und Lusern / Kulturinstitut Bersntol-Lusérn, Palù del Fèrsina (Trento) 2003,  (Digitalisat: PDF)

Dictionary
Anthony Rowley: Fersentaler Wörterbuch. Wörterverzeichnis der deutschen Sprachinselmundart des Fersentals in der Provinz Trient/Oberitalien. Buske, Hamburg 1989 (= Bayreuther Beiträge zur Sprachwissenschaft, Dialektologie, 2), 

Secondary literature
 Cognola, Federica: Costruzioni infinitivali e fenomeni di trasparenza nel dialetto della Valle del Fèrsina In: Quaderni patavini di linguistica 22 (2006), pg. 3-48
 Křížek, Ondřej: German-speaking groups in Italy. Kulturní studia / Cultural Studies 2/2017, p. 27-55, 
 Mirtes, Hans: Das Ferstental und die Fersentaler. Zur Geographie, Geschichte und Volkskunde einer deutschen Sprachinsel im Trentino/Norditalien. Institute für Geographie, Regensburg 1996 (= Regensburger geographische Schriften, Heft 26)
 Pellegrini, Giovanni Battista (ed.): La Valle del Fèrsina e le isole linguistiche di origine tedesca nel Trentino: Atti del convegno interdisciplinare, Sant'Orsola (Trento), 1 - 3 settembre 1978. Museo degli usi e costumi della gente trentina, S. Michele all'Adige 1979
 Rowley, Anthony: "Mocheno e Cimbro". Von Dialekt(en) zu Sprache(n)? In: Dieter Stellmacher (ed.), Dialektologie zwischen Tradition und Neuansätzen: Beiträge der Internationalen Dialektologentagung, Göttingen, 19. - 21. Oktober 1998, Steiner, Stuttgart 2000 (= Zeitschrift für Dialektologie und Linguistik, Beiheft 109), pg. 213-221, 
 Rowley, Anthony: Die Mundarten des Fersentals. In: Maria Hornung (ed.), Die deutschen Sprachinseln in den Südalpen. Mundarten und Volkstum, Olms, Hildesheim / Zürich / New York, 1994 (= Studien zur Dialektologie, 3; Germanistische Linguistik, 124/125), pg. 145-160, 
 Rowley, Anthony: Die Sprachinseln der Fersentaler und Zimbern. In: Robert Hinderling / Ludwig M. Eichinger (ed.): Handbuch der mitteleuropäischen Sprachminderheiten, Narr, Tübingen 1996, pg. 263-285, 
 Rowley, Anthony: Fersental (Val Fèrsina bei Trient/Oberitalien) - Untersuchung einer Sprachinselmundart. Niemeryer, Tübingen 1986 (= Phonai. Lautbibliothek der deutschen Sprachen und Mundarten, Deutsche Reihe, Bd. 28; Monographien, Bd. 18), 
 Wurzer, Bernhard: Die deutschen Sprachinseln in Oberitalien. 5. erw. Aufl., Athesia, Bozen 1983,

External links 

 Homepage of the Bernstoler Kulturinstitut

Bavarian language
German dialects
Languages of Trentino-Alto Adige/Südtirol